Kyiv Peninsula is the predominantly ice-covered, oval shaped peninsula projecting 35 km in northwest direction from the west side of Graham Land, Antarctic Peninsula. It is bounded by Flandres Bay to the northeast and Beascochea Bay to the southwest, and separated from Wilhelm Archipelago to the northwest by Lemaire Channel and Penola Strait. The peninsula's north extremity Cape Renard divides Graham Coast to the southwest from Danco Coast to the northeast. Mount Demaria is found on the west coast of the peninsula.

Etymology
The feature was first described and named in 2010 by the Antarctic Place-names Commission of Bulgaria after the capital city of Ukraine, in connection with the Ukrainian Antarctic base Vernadsky situated on nearby Galindez Island. The original naming was done in Bulgarian. Later, the name was adopted also by Ukraine in 2020 and translated Kyiv Peninsula.

Location
British mapping in 1976.

Maps
 British Antarctic Territory. Scale 1:200000 topographic map. DOS 610 Series, Sheet W 65 62.  Directorate of Overseas Surveys, Tolworth, UK, 1976
 Brabant Island to Argentine Islands. Scale 1:250000 topographic map. British Antarctic Survey, 2008
 Antarctic Digital Database (ADD). Scale 1:250000 topographic map of Antarctica. Scientific Committee on Antarctic Research (SCAR). Since 1993, regularly upgraded and updated

Notes

References
 Bulgarian Antarctic Gazetteer. Antarctic Place-names Commission. (details in Bulgarian, basic data in English)
 Kyiv Peninsula. SCAR Composite Gazetteer of Antarctica
 Kyiv Peninsula. SCAR Composite Gazetteer of Antarctica

External links
 Kyiv Peninsula. Adjusted Copernix satellite image

Peninsulas of Antarctica
Bulgaria and the Antarctic
Danco Coast
Graham Coast
Antarctic region
Ukraine and the Antarctic